The Newmarket Public Library is a public library in the town of Newmarket, Ontario, Canada.

The library has a board of directors consisting of at least five members, with at most a minority of which are members of Newmarket Town Council. The library chief executive officer is Todd Kyle, who was hired for the position on 3 May 2010 and held the position until he left the library in January 2021. He will be succeeded by Tracy Munusami on 3 August 2021.

History
On 4 January 1904, a town plebiscite was conducted to determine whether residents supported a publicly financed library and reading room. The vote was 90–26 in favour of using tax revenues to fund the library, with support in each of the three wards (36–5 in St. George's Ward, 36–10 in St. Andrew's Ward, and 18–11 in St. Patrick's Ward).

Collections
In 2009, the library established a video games collection. It also digitized the Bowman art collection, comprising paintings, sculptures and other artworks, and made it accessible on its website in 2010. The website also provides access to lithograph prints of the Frederick Hagan Collection and various community collections.

Services
The library grants a free membership card to any individual that resides, works, or is a student in Newmarket or any of the other municipalities of York Region, that is Aurora, East Gwillimbury, Georgina, King, Markham, Richmond Hill, Vaughan, and Whitchurch–Stouffville.

The library offers room rentals, access to numerous databases, genealogy and town history research tools, and exam proctoring for "any person enrolled in an academic institution that requires students to complete examinations under the supervision of an approved proctor". It operates The Era, a digitization program to digitally preserve the town's newspaper.

Programs for children, youth, and adults are offered seasonally. The library participates in the student-operated volunteer Chess in the Library program.

It also allows patrons to return loaned material at a dropbox at Upper Canada Mall, which is accessible when the mall is open.

The library is open Tuesday to Thursday 11a.m- 7p.m, and Friday to Saturday 11a.m-5p.m. closes for all Canadian public holidays, including Good Friday, Easter, Canada Day, Christmas, Boxing Day, and New Year's Day.
These days you can visit the Newmarket Public online Library(NPL library). In the online library, you can access all books for different age groups.

See also
List of public libraries in Ontario

Notes

References

External links
Newmarket Public Library
Strategic Plan 2013-2016 at the Newmarket Public Library
Newmarket Public Library at Shared Digital Infrastructure

Public libraries in Ontario
Newmarket, Ontario